The K-POP World Festival is an annual K-pop talent competition organized by South Korea's Ministry of Foreign Affairs with the support of numerous government agencies. After going through a few preliminary rounds, fans of K-pop are invited by the South Korean government to take part in the final round of the competition held every year in Changwon, South Korea.

Background
The event is organized by South Korea's Ministry of Foreign Affairs with the support from various state agencies including:

 The Ministry of Culture, Sports and Tourism (MCST)
 The Korean Broadcasting System (KBS)
 Overseas diplomatic missions and embassies of South Korea

According to the organizers, the purpose of the event is to bring Hallyu fans from all over the world to South Korea, thereby fusing the culture of Korea with the cultures of various countries from all over the world.

Timeline

2011
The preliminary competition was hosted in 16 countries with more than 30,000 applicants and over 10,000 fans attending the December 7 finals in Changwon. Boy group JAM from Kazakhstan who performed Shinee's Ring Ding Dong won the performance grand prize while solo performer Karla Carreon from Philippine who performed Yumi's Star won the vocals grand prize. Guest performers included T-ara, Secret, Sistar, K.Will, Boyfriend, MBLAQ, Infinite and CNBLUE.

2012
The competition was hosted in 33 countries before finals on October 28. Girl group O.M.G. from who performed Girl Generation medley won the performance grand prize. According to the Embassy of Czech Republic in Seoul, the Ambassador, Jaroslav Olša, Jr., personally congratulated them on winning the contest. The group received a CD containing a South Korean adaptation of a famous Czech musical. Duo from Indonesia, Nadya and Marwah who performed Sistar 19's Ma Boy won the vocals grand prize. Guest performers included TVXQ, Secret, MBLAQ, F.T. Island, B.A.P and Apink.

2013
The competition was hosted in 58 cities from 43 nations, with more than 60,000 applicants, and over 25,000 fans attending the October 20 finals in Changwon.  Performance grand prizes were awarded to girl group Alladin from Uzbekistan who performed Miss A's Bad Girl Good Girl and vocals grand prize were awarded to solo performer Arnelle Nonon from the U.S. who performed Lee Hi's "1,2,3,4". Guest performers included Miss A, EXO, Rainbow, Infinite and B.A.P.

2014
The preliminary competition was hosted in 70 countries before the finals on October 19 in Changwon. Overall grand prize were awarded to girl group GGC Crew from Ireland who performed Girls' Generation's I Got A Boy. The performance grand prize were awarded to a group from Finland High Definition who performed BTS's Boy In Luv while a team from Japan, Flashy who performed Ailee's I Will Show You won the vocals grand prize. Guest performers included EXO-K, B.A.P, Block B, IU, Sistar and Apink.

Award

Other Contestant

These contestants didn't win an award, but they did perform and represent their country:

2015 
Awards

The Pacific Starz of Nigeria won the overall Grand Prize of 12 Million South Korean Won ($12,000). The group led by Praise Nelson  and made up of 5 members, performed the BTS song Danger.

Other Contestant

These contestants didn't win an award, but they did perform and represent their country:

2016

Scoring system

Award

Other Contestant

These contestants didn't win an award, but they did perform and represent their country:

2017
Guest Performances was done by BTS, Monsta X, Twice, Ailee, NCT 127, J Black, Astro

Award

Other Contestant

These contestants didn't win an award, but they did perform and represent their country:

2018
Due to the Kong-Rey Typhoon this is the first time the performance was without an audience and with a special guest performer (even Stray Kids presenting the award). This is also the first time for the competition with a new concept of the "Bracket System" From 6 different category. In addition 2 Special Prizes which is "Grand Award (Daesang)" & "People`s Choice Award". In 2020 an academic article about this Changwon Festival focused on the 2018 contest was published in the journal Transactions of the Royal Asiatic Society Korea Branch.

2019 
 Host : Lee Hwi-jae , DinDin & Lia (Itzy)
 Special Performance : Monsta X, TXT, Itzy, The Boyz, Momoland & Red Velvet

Judging Score 

 Training Score Are Score That Achieve During Their Training Before The Show
 Judging Score Are Score That They Got During The Show ( Judges : JeA ( Brown Eyed Girls ), Changmin & Bae Yoon Jung )
 For The First Time Ever The Dance Act & Vocal Act Are Combined Together.

Awards 

 The Friendship Award is based on staff choice.

List of competitors

2020
It Was Revealed That The 2020 Edition Will Be Cancelled Due To The Ongoing COVID-19 pandemic

2021 
 Theme : How K-Pop Save Me
 Host : Yoo In-na
 Special Performance : Aespa, Monsta X, Stray Kids, Ateez, The Boyz, Oh My Girl, Oneus & Cravity

Due to the Ongoing COVID-19 Pandemic, this is the second time the performance was without an audience. This is also the return of the "Bracket System" however the battle is based on the theme of nature and mainly focused on Dance Performance. In addition 2 Special Prizes was introduced which is "Best Performance" & "Best Story".

Judging Score

Performances and Awards

See also

List of music festivals in South Korea

References

External links

 K-Pop World Festival 2013 Audition clips – https://www.youtube.com/user/kbskpopworld
 K-Pop streaming service – http://www.genie.co.kr/en/

Music festivals in South Korea
Electronic music festivals in South Korea
2011 establishments in South Korea
Music festivals established in 2011
K-pop festivals
Rock festivals in South Korea
Annual events in South Korea